Antoanetta "Annie" Ivanova (Chinese Traditional: 易安妮 Yì Ānnī) is an international curator and author, cultural entrepreneur and one of Australia's leading authorities on cultural diplomacy. Ivanova has collaborated with the Centre Pompidou, Ars Electronica, Barbican, Smithsonian Institution, National Palace Museum, Australian Centre for the Moving Image, and Queensland Gallery of Modern Art, among others.

Education

Annie Ivanova holds MA qualifications in Foreign Affairs and International Trade from Monash University, Graduate School of Business and Economics in Melbourne. She pursued interests in Global Leadership, Cultural Diplomacy, Entrepreneurship and Strategic Management.

Ivanova's first academic degree is from the University of Tasmania, graduating with Bachelor of Fine Arts (BFA Hons.) in 1998. Her Honours theses discussed the effect of mass media when reporting stories about war atrocities.

In the late 1980s, Ivanova studied at the Bulgarian National College of Polygraphs and Photography. The college was one of the then most progressive professional schools in the country, preparing students for careers in film and TV. She majored in photography, specializing in photojournalism.

Career
Professionally active since 1996, Annie Ivanova has initiated and realised over 80 international exhibitions, conferences and public diplomacy projects. She is a Fellow of the Australian Institute of Company Directors and Australian Institute of International Affairs.

Ivanova has chaired and produced three major international conferences, and has been a keynote speaker on wide-ranging Culture & Creative Industries topics.

Global work scope spans: USA, Canada, UK, France, Germany, Spain, Italy, Austria, Denmark, Finland, Iceland, Eastern Europe, Greece, Turkey, Malaysia, Thailand, Vietnam, China, Korea, Japan, Singapore, Taiwan, and Australia.

Ivanova co-founded and was the executive director of Australia's first media arts agency Novamedia Ltd. Between 2001 and 2011, Novamedia represented some of Australia's most renowned media artists: Jon MacCormack, Stelarc, Drew Berry, Troy Innocent, Justine Cooper, George Khut. It also initiated and produced projects for Australia's overseas diplomatic missions.

In 2012, Australia Unlimited, the national branding campaign promoting Australia's most inspiring achievers, featured Ivanova's blockbuster exhibition 'Wonderland: New Contemporary Art from Australia' at MOCATaipei. The piece was narrated by art historian Edmund Capon.

Ivanova is the first and only foreign curator to travel across Taiwan to work with the Taiwanese aborigines, researching artists from every tribe. She has become a passionate advocate for the preservation of local indigenous heritage. In a public statement she says: "Elders are dying out without their knowledge being recorded. This common to all humankind heritage is becoming endangered and it could disappear within two generations. It needs all the international attention it could get. I'm compelled to do my part." Her pioneering work was recognised in the inaugural Australian Arts in Asia Awards.

In recognition of her cultural work in Taiwan, Ivanova received a scholarship from the Taiwanese government to undertake Chinese Language studies at the Mandarin Training Center of National Taiwan Normal University in Taipei, Taiwan, which came to fame as the college of Australia's Chinese-speaking Prime Minister Kevin Rudd.

Over the course of her career Ivanova has received over 55 awards from national and international institutions, becoming the most successful independent curator in Australia.

In 2016, Annie Ivanova became the first cultural representative to receive the prestigious ANZ Chamber of Commerce Business Award for "outstanding contribution the Australia-Taiwan Relationship". She is also the only businesswoman awarded that year.

Annie Ivanova is also the Regional President of Asia Designer Communication Platform, which helps designers show their work and has held events in cities within Asia.

Personal life

Annie Ivanova was born in Tryavna, Bulgaria to an artistic family. Her father was an industrial designer and her mother drama teacher. Her grandfather had a professional photographic studio in the 1930s. During the 1989 revolution Ivanova was working as a junior reporter, assisting Reuters photographer Oleg Popov. She was a front-line witness of the dramatic events leading to the collapse of communism in Sofia. Soon after, with the help of a colleague, she moved to London where she studied design at the London College of Fashion. In 1994 Ivanova immigrated to Australia.

Ivanova identifies herself as an Australian of Bulgarian heritage. She has commented that her international work has always been about “persuading through culture and ideas that reach across borders”. She has said the Balkan atrocities of the 1990s have left a very deep mark in her mind, becoming a motivational force to pursue a career in international relations.

Following long term interests in Asian culture, since 2010 she has been living between Melbourne and Taipei. The Chinese name given to her by a friend is 易安妮 (Yì Ānnī). Yì was taken from the character in I-Ching "Book of Changes" as an auspicious match. In Taiwan she is known by her Chinese name.

Taiwan by Design

Annie Ivanova is the acclaimed author of "Taiwan by Design: 88 products for better living" the first comprehensive design book from the Beautiful Island. The project took two and a half years to complete and ran a successful crowdfunding campaign raising NT 1,500,000.
The North American release of the book featured on CNN, and it was reported as breaking news by all major newspapers in Taiwan.

Significant exhibitions

International curator-in-residence

References

Living people
Year of birth missing (living people)
20th-century births
Australian curators
Australian expatriates in Taiwan
Bulgarian emigrants to Australia
Bulgarian expatriates in Australia
Eastern Orthodox Christians from Australia
Eastern Orthodox Christians from Bulgaria
Fellows of the Australian Institute of Company Directors
People from Melbourne
People from Tryavna
University of Tasmania alumni
Australian women curators